Hajdar Hysen Blloshmi (24 April 1844 – 9 December 1936) was one of the delegates of Albanian Declaration of Independence and a deputy of Pogradec in the Albanian parliament. His son, Salahydin was a member of the constitutional court of Albania and a deputy of the Albanian parliament in 1925-8.

Blloshmi was born in Bërzeshtë, Librazhd District, Ottoman Empire, in the present-day municipality of Prrenjas.

References

1844 births
1936 deaths
People from Prrenjas
19th-century Albanian people
20th-century Albanian people
People from Manastir vilayet
All-Albanian Congress delegates
Second Congress of Manastir delegates
Members of the Parliament of Albania